Sar Kubeh (also Romanized as Sar Kūbeh, Sar Koobeh, and Ser Kūbeh) is a village in Hamzehlu Rural District, in the Central District of Khomeyn County, Markazi Province, Iran. At the 2006 census, its population was 300, in 92 families.

References 

Populated places in Khomeyn County